General elections were held in Liberia in 1901. In the presidential election, incumbent Garreston W. Gibson of the True Whig Party was elected for the first time, having originally taken office after the resignation of William D. Coleman in December 1900. He defeated Coleman, who ran on the People's Party ticket.

References

Liberia
1901 in Liberia
Elections in Liberia
Election and referendum articles with incomplete results